Eugenio Saenz is a census-designated place (CDP) in Starr County, Texas, United States. It is a new CDP formed from part of the old La Victoria CDP prior to the 2010 census with a population of 159.

Geography
Eugenio Saenz is located at  (26.358253, -98.633123).

Education
It is in the Rio Grande City Grulla Independent School District (formerly Rio Grande City Consolidated Independent School District)

References

Census-designated places in Starr County, Texas